Mind on the Moon is an album by Canadian reggae musician Snow, released in 2000. Despite being his fifth album, this was the first disc since his 1993 debut 12 Inches of Snow that Snow returned to the pop charts and received mainstream airplay on both radio and television.

The album's lead single, "Everybody Wants to Be Like You" received the most radio airplay, reaching #2 on Canada's Top Singles chart. The album's second single, "The Plumb Song", also received significant radio airplay and its music video received heavy rotation on MuchMusic. Three singles from the album ("Everybody Wants to Be Like You", "The Plumb Song" and "Joke Thing") were among the top 100 most played radio tracks in Canada in 2001.

The album was nominated for "Best Pop Album" at the Juno Awards of 2001.

Track listing

Notes
"Scrub Off" features guest vocals from Shantall
"Little Did They Know" features guest vocals from Greig Nori.
"Funky Martini" features guest vocals from Mark Jackson.

Personnel
Adapted from the liner notes of Mind on the Moon.

Vocals
Justin Gray – background vocals (track 8)
Mark Jackson – background vocals (track 1)
Shantall – background vocals (tracks 3, 5)
Miranda Walsh – background vocals (tracks 1, 4, 8, 12)
Karen Zilahi – background vocals (tracks 1, 5, 10)

Musicians

Justin Abedin – guitar (tracks 1–3, 5, 7–9, 12)
Tony Baltaglia – guitar (track 4)
Adrian Eccleston – guitar (track 11)
Glenn Marais – guitar (tracks 2, 6, 7), harmonica (track 8)
Greig Nori – guitar (track 7), programming (track 6)
Robbie Patterson – guitar (track 4, 10), bass (tracks 1, 4, 5–8, 10, 12)
Chin Injeti – bass, keyboards (track 2)
Adrian Passarelli – drums (track 11)
Winston "Pappy" Frederick – steel drums (track 10)

Adam Alexander – keyboards (track 10), synths (track 1)
Justin Gray – acoustic guitar (track 8), keyboards (track 11), programming (track 6)
Dave Greenberg – keyboards, drum programming (tracks 4, 7, 12)
Michael Tucker – keyboards, drum programming (tracks 2, 4, 7, 12)
Darrin O'Brien – drum programming (track 10)
DJ Tab – scratches (tracks 1, 3, 5, 6, 8, 11)
DJ S-Luv – scratches (track 4)
Roger Salvesen – programming (track 11)
Deryck Whibley – programming (track 6)

Production
MC Shan – vocal production and engineering (tracks 2, 9)
Michael Tucker – mixing
Bob Ludwig – mastering at Gateway Mastering (Portland, Maine)
Ed Krautner – assistant engineer
Rob Gil – assistant engineer
Joel Kazmi – assistant engineer

Artwork
Kent Howard – Snow logo
Christopher Wahl – photography
Darko – design, photography

References

2000 albums
Snow (musician) albums
EMI Records albums
Albums recorded at Long View Farm
Albums recorded at Metalworks Studios